Power electronics is a style of noise music that typically consists of static, screeching waves of feedback, analogue synthesizers making sub-bass pulses or high frequency squealing sounds; with (sometimes) screamed and distorted vocals. The genre is noted for its influence from industrial.

Power electronics is generally atonal, like most noise music; it also features a lack of conventional melodies or rhythms. To match its sonic excess, power electronics relies heavily upon extreme thematic and visual content: whether in lyrics, album art, or live performance actions. It is a genre that often invites strong reactions from both listeners and critics, if not dismissed or ignored altogether. Power electronics is related to the early Industrial Records scene but later became more aligned with noise music.

Etymology and background 
The name of the genre was coined by William Bennett (experimental musician and founding member of Whitehouse and Cut Hands) as part of the sleeve notes to the 1982 Whitehouse album Psychopathia Sexualis. Tellus Audio Cassette Magazine produced a compilation compact cassette tape called Power Electronics in 1986 that was curated by Joseph Nechvatal.

Death industrial
Death industrial is an industrial subgenre typified by a dense atmosphere, low-end drones, harsh loops and screamed and/or distorted vocals. It can be differentiated from power electronics by a slower, more atmospheric sound reminiscent of dark ambient, and a less abrasive sound. Acts described as death industrial include Brighter Death Now, Anenzephalia, Atrax Morgue, Aelia Capitolina, Author & Punisher, Genocide Organ, Ramleh, Hieronymus Bosch, Stratvm Terror, Staat Und Organisation (band) and Dead Man's Hill.

See also
 Electroacoustic improvisation
 Experimental music
 Sonology

References

1982 neologisms
20th-century music genres
Extended techniques
Industrial music
Noise music
British styles of music